Michael Jonas Evans (November 3, 1949 – December 14, 2006) was an American actor, best known as Lionel Jefferson on both All in the Family and The Jeffersons. He was also a guest celebrity panelist on the TV game show Match Game.

Early life
Evans was born in Salisbury, North Carolina. His father, Theodore Evans Sr., was a dentist, and his mother, Annie Sue Evans, a teacher. He attended Palmer Memorial Institute, a private school for young black Americans in Sedalia, North Carolina. His family later moved to Los Angeles, where he graduated from Los Angeles High School. He studied acting at Los Angeles City College.

Career
A college student majoring in drama but with no acting experience, Evans caught his big break when All in the Family producer and director John Rich hired him to play Lionel Jefferson, the son of the Bunkers' new black neighbors. Show developer Norman Lear preferred Cleavon Little for the role, but Rich lobbied to cast an actor who would appear less threatening.

Evans continued to play the role on the spinoff The Jeffersons, but left after the first season to pursue other aspects of his career. According to Jimmie Walker, Evans had threatened to leave if he was not given more screen time, and Norman Lear let him out of his contract. Actor and opera singer Damon Evans (no relation to Michael) then took the role of Lionel, but Mike Evans returned in the role for the sixth through eighth seasons. Evans was a creator/writer of the series Good Times (1974–79).

Evans played Lenny in the cast of the 1976–77 Danny Thomas situation comedy The Practice during its second and final season.

Evans was also a real estate investor and owned properties in California's Inland Empire.

Personal life and death
In July 1974, Evans met Helena Jefferson (1952–2002). They married on January 10, 1976. On September 11, 2002, Helena Evans died of breast cancer after she was diagnosed with it in February 2001.

Four years after her death, Evans died of throat cancer at his mother's home in Twentynine Palms, California, at the age of 57.

He was survived by his two daughters (Carlena and Tammie), his mother (Annie Sue), a brother, a cousin, and a niece. Evans's body was cremated.

Filmography

References

Further reading

E! Online (22 Dec 2006, 02:56:00 PM PST):  "Jeffersons Star Dead", by Joal Ryan
Buffalo News, December 23, 2006.
Variety, January 8, 2007.

External links

1949 births
2006 deaths
20th-century American male actors
African-American male actors
American male television actors
American television writers
Deaths from esophageal cancer
Deaths from cancer in California
Los Angeles City College alumni
Los Angeles High School alumni
Male actors from North Carolina
American male television writers
People from Salisbury, North Carolina
People from San Bernardino County, California
Screenwriters from California
Screenwriters from North Carolina
20th-century American screenwriters
20th-century American male writers
20th-century African-American writers
21st-century African-American people
African-American male writers